The Triangle Tribune is an American, English language weekly newspaper headquartered in Durham, North Carolina.  It was founded in 1998 and targets the African-American community.  The Charlotte Post Publishing Company owns The Triangle Tribune and its sister paper The Charlotte Post.

See also
 List of newspapers published in North Carolina

References

African-American history in Durham, North Carolina
Weekly newspapers published in North Carolina
African-American newspapers
1998 establishments in North Carolina
Publications established in 1998
Mass media in Durham, North Carolina